Jhan Carlos Mariñez Fuente (pronounced "Yan MArin-yez") (born August 12, 1988) is a Dominican professional baseball pitcher who is a free agent. He has played in Major League Baseball (MLB) for the Florida Marlins, Chicago White Sox, Tampa Bay Rays, Milwaukee Brewers, Pittsburgh Pirates, Texas Rangers, and Baltimore Orioles.

Career

Florida Marlins
Mariñez signed with the Florida Marlins as an amateur free agent in 2006. He was called up to the majors for the first time on July 15, 2010.

Chicago White Sox
Mariñez and Osvaldo Martínez were sent to the Chicago White Sox as compensation for the hiring of Ozzie Guillén by the Marlins, as Guillen had one year remaining on his contract with the White Sox. On July 13, 2012, Marinez was called up to the majors. He was outrighted off the roster on September 6, 2013.

Detroit Tigers
Mariñez signed a minor league deal with the Detroit Tigers on November 18, 2013 and was assigned to the AAA Toledo Mud Hens. Along with former Tiger Nate Robertson, he was released from his minor league contract on May 17, 2014 after struggling with his command.

Los Angeles Dodgers
He signed a minor league contract with the Los Angeles Dodgers after being released by Detroit. He was assigned to the AA Chattanooga Lookouts. In 21 appearances, he was 7–1 with a 4.91 ERA.

Tampa Bay Rays
On December 31, 2014, he signed a minor league contract with the Tampa Bay Rays. He spent the entire 2015 season between the AA and AAA levels of the Rays.

Milwaukee Brewers
On May 13, 2016, Mariñez was acquired off waivers by the Milwaukee Brewers. He made his Brewers debut on May 22, coming in relief of Chase Anderson, facing the New York Mets. He gave up no hits, walked one and struck out four in two innings of work. He was designated for assignment on May 15, 2017, to create room for Brent Suter who was recalled from AAA.

Pittsburgh Pirates
On May 18, 2017, Mariñez was claimed off waivers by the Pittsburgh Pirates.

Texas Rangers
The Texas Rangers claimed Mariñez from the Pirates off of waivers on August 10, 2017.

Baltimore Orioles
On November 28, 2017, Mariñez signed a minor league deal with the Baltimore Orioles. He had his contract purchased on July 10, 2018. He was outrighted to AAA Norfolk Tides on August 31, 2018. He declared free agency on October 3, 2018.

Diablos Rojos del México
On April 3, 2019, Mariñez signed with the Diablos Rojos del México of the Mexican League. He was released on April 19, 2019.

Sultanes de Monterrey
On February 5, 2020, Mariñez signed with the Sultanes de Monterrey of the Mexican League. Mariñez did not play in a game in 2020 due to the cancellation of the Mexican League season because of the COVID-19 pandemic. After the 2020 season, he played for Águilas Cibaeñas of the Dominican Professional Baseball League(LIDOM). He has also played for Dominican Republic in the 2021 Caribbean Series.

Chicago White Sox (second stint)
On January 14, 2022, Mariñez signed with the Bravos de León of the Mexican League. However, prior to the 2022 LMB season, on March 8, his contract was purchased by the Chicago White Sox organization. He elected free agency on November 10, 2022.

References

External links

1988 births
Living people
Baltimore Orioles players
Baseball players at the 2019 Pan American Games
Baseball players at the 2020 Summer Olympics
Medalists at the 2020 Summer Olympics
Olympic medalists in baseball
Olympic bronze medalists for the Dominican Republic
Bristol White Sox players
Charlotte Knights players
Chattanooga Lookouts players
Chicago White Sox players
Diablos Rojos del México players
Dominican Republic expatriate baseball players in Mexico
Dominican Republic expatriate baseball players in the United States
Dominican Summer League Marlins players
Durham Bulls players
Gulf Coast Marlins players
Florida Marlins players
Jacksonville Suns players
Jupiter Hammerheads players
Major League Baseball pitchers
Major League Baseball players from the Dominican Republic
Mexican League baseball pitchers
Milwaukee Brewers players
Montgomery Biscuits players
Norfolk Tides players
Pittsburgh Pirates players
Tampa Bay Rays players
Texas Rangers players
Toledo Mud Hens players
Toros del Este players
Pan American Games competitors for the Dominican Republic
Olympic baseball players of the Dominican Republic
Sportspeople from Santo Domingo